The president of Nauru is elected by Parliament from among its members, and is both the head of state and the head of government of Nauru. Nauru's unicameral Parliament has 19 members, with an electoral term of 3 years. Political parties only play a minor role in Nauru politics, and there have often been periods of instability in the Presidential office. Shifting allegiances among a small number of individuals can lead to frequent changes in the makeup of the government of the day, including the presidential position itself.

List of officeholders

Latest election

See also
 List of colonial governors of Nauru

References

Politics of Nauru
Nauru
 
Presidents
1968 establishments in Nauru